Hameda Ben Amor (born 7 October 1989), better known by his stage name El General, is a Tunisian rap musician.  His song "Rais Lebled", released in November 2010, has been described as the "anthem of the Jasmine Revolution".

Career
Ben Amor has been making mainly political rap songs since 2007. The songs were previously kept underground by the strict censorship of the autocratic regime of Tunisian president Zine El Abidine Ben Ali. On December 24, 2010, two days after his second famous protest song "Tunisia Our Country" was released on YouTube and Facebook and one week after the protests in Tunisia began, he was arrested by Tunisian police. Three days later, Ben Amor was released, after being forced to sign a statement to no longer make any political songs.

Ben Amor's “President of the Country,” a searing Arabic rap song, served as a soundtrack for the revolution. The week before Mohamed Bouazizi’s death, Hamada Ben Amor used a handheld camera to tape himself singing the song, a baseball cap pulled over his eyes. “Mr. President,” he exclaimed, “your people are dead!” Al Jazeera and various social media picked up the video. The secret police arrested Ben Amor, inflaming his followers, and hastening Ben Ali’s exit.

After the overthrow of Ben Ali, his songs enjoyed enormous popularity in Tunisia, particularly "Rais Lebled" which became known as the anthem of the revolution and gained him international recognition.

Discography
Albums
"Malesh?"
"Sidi Rais"
"Rais Lebled"
"Tounes bledna"
 Hor 
 Yhebbou Ylezzouni
 3ammel 3al 3ali 
 Mechia w Tzid 
 Tfol Sghir
 Mise à jour 
 Solo
 Ma Nsina 
 Ready 
 Hwemna 
 Donia 
 Tsunami 
 Waadi 
 Fannen & Ensen
Contributing artist
The Rough Guide To Arabic Revolution (2013, World Music Network)

See also 
List of Arab rappers

References

External links 
 "Rais Lebled" on Youtube.com (with English subtitles)
 Video interview with El Général

21st-century Tunisian male singers
Tunisian rappers
Living people
21st-century rappers
1989 births